DABCO (1,4-diazabicyclo[2.2.2]octane), also known as triethylenediamine or TEDA, is a bicyclic organic compound with the formula N2(C2H4)3. This colorless solid is a highly nucleophilic tertiary amine base, which is used as a catalyst and reagent in polymerization and organic synthesis.

It is similar in structure to quinuclidine, but the latter has one of the nitrogen atoms replaced by a carbon atom.

Reactions
The pKa of [HDABCO]+ (the protonated derivative) is 8.8, which is almost the same as ordinary alkylamines. The nucleophilicity of the amine is high because the amine centers are unhindered. It is sufficiently basic to promote C–C coupling of terminal acetylenes, for example, phenylacetylene couples with electron-deficient iodoarenes.

Catalyst
DABCO is used as a base-catalyst for:
formation of polyurethane from alcohol and isocyanate functionalized monomers and pre-polymers.
Baylis-Hillman reactions of aldehydes and unsaturated ketones and aldehydes.

Lewis base
As an unhindered amine, it is a strong ligand and Lewis base. It forms a crystalline 2:1 adduct with hydrogen peroxide and sulfur dioxide.

Quencher of singlet oxygen
DABCO and related amines are quenchers of singlet oxygen and effective antioxidants, and can be used to improve the lifetime of dyes. This makes DABCO useful in dye lasers and in mounting samples for fluorescence microscopy (when used with glycerol and PBS). DABCO can also be used to demethylate quaternary ammonium salts by heating in dimethylformamide (DMF).

Production
It is produced by thermal reactions of compounds of the type H2NCH2CH2X (X = OH, NH2, or NHR) in the presence of zeolitic catalysts. An idealized conversion is shown for the conversion from ethanolamine:
3 H2NCH2CH2OH → N(CH2CH2)3N + NH3 + 3 H2O

Uses
In chemical and biological defense, activated carbon is impregnated with DABCO for use in filters for masks, collective protection systems, and the like.

References

Further reading
.

Diamines
Nitrogen heterocycles
Tertiary amines
Heterocyclic compounds with 2 rings
Reagents for organic chemistry